George Théodore Berthon  (3 May 1806 – 18 January 1892) was a portrait painter from France.

Biography 
Berthon's father, René Théodore Berthon, was a court painter to Napoleon I, and likely trained his son in art. As well, his knowledge of art in Paris would have been significant: his father was a student of Jacques Louis David. As an adult, he lived in England for a number of years in the household of Sir Robert Peel to teach Peel's daughters drawing and French. The first verifiable record of his immigration to Canada is an advertisement for his portraiture services in a Toronto newspaper in 1845.

Berthon was notable in the history of Canada for his creation of formal portraits characterized by a sense of realism. He focused on defining his subjects' features and characters without idealization. The composition of his portraits remains simple with dark backgrounds. His work is important both as a historical record and as an example of the style of Canadian portraiture during that period.

He was nominated as a founding member of the Royal Canadian Academy of Arts
but failed to qualify. He was elected a life member of the Ontario Society of Artists in 1891.

He died of a bronchial infection, at his Toronto home, in 1892.

Paintings

References

Bibliography

External links 

 

1806 births
1892 deaths
19th-century Canadian painters
Canadian male painters
19th-century Canadian male artists
Canadian portrait painters